Josef Meixner (born 7 December 1939) is an Austrian former sports shooter. He competed at four Olympic Games.

References

1939 births
Living people
Austrian male sport shooters
Olympic shooters of Austria
Shooters at the 1964 Summer Olympics
Shooters at the 1968 Summer Olympics
Shooters at the 1972 Summer Olympics
Shooters at the 1976 Summer Olympics
Sportspeople from Bratislava
20th-century Austrian people